Bromochlorosalicylanilide is an antifungal.  It may cause allergic contact dermatitis in some individuals.

References 

Antifungals
Chloroarenes
Bromoarenes
Salicylanilides